Brian Hughes (born 27 June 1985) is a Northern Irish jockey who competes in National Hunt racing. Hughes won the British jump racing Champion Jockey title for the 2019–20 season with 141 winners. Hughes comes from County Armagh, but is based in Northern England and became the first champion jockey based in the North since Jonjo O'Neill won the title in 1980. On 20 April 2022, Hughes rode his 200th winner in a season - a feat previously achieved only by Peter Scudamore,  AP McCoy &  Richard Johnson. Hughes won his second jockeys' title for the 2021-22 season.

Cheltenham Festival winners (3) 
 Centenary Novices' Handicap Chase - (2) Ballyalton (2016), Mister Whitaker (2018)
 Fred Winter Juvenile Novices' Handicap Hurdle - (1) Hawk High (2014)

Major wins
 Great Britain
 Ascot Chase - (1) Waiting Patiently (2018)
 Top Novices' Hurdle - (1) Cyrus Darius (2015)

References

1985 births
Living people
British Champion jumps jockeys
Irish jockeys
Sportspeople from County Armagh
Lester Award winners